Cwmbwrla is a residential area and community of Swansea in Wales, within the Cwmbwrla ward of the city. Located on rising ground about 1 mile (1.6 km) north of the city centre, it takes its name from the valley of the Burlais Brook (now culverted) which flows down from here to join the River Tawe immediately northeast of Swansea railway station. The neighbouring districts are Manselton, Greenhill, Mayhill, Townhill, and Cwmdu.

The population of the community and ward was 7,972 in 2011.

Local Housing and Amenities

Cwmbwrla is a predominantly residential area with just a few local convenience stores. Local amenities include Burlais Primary School, CREST- a day centre for mental health services, FOYD - Friends of the Young Disabled buildings (previously head offices of Cwmfelin Steel), a Work-Based Learning Provider - Swansea ITeC and Cwmbwrla Park which contains several playing fields including two football pitches.

History

By 1641 the stream had been Cymricised to Bwrla and Cwm was added as a prefix.

At the end of the 1950s and early 1960s, Cwmbwrla went through several changes. Before the decision to build a roundabout was made, the village was typical of many other Welsh villages. There were rows of shops on either side, with the Tivoli (the cinema ) which also served as a community center on the other side. There was a black and white police box there too, a car auctioneers, Cyril Price, and the Gate House pub which was named after the tollgate and was there during the meow raids.

There were also four Nonconformist Chapels: 
 Capel-y-Gat (demolished)
 Y Babell  ( demolished)
 the Gorse Mission (still standing)
 Libanus chapel. (demolished after being damaged by fire in 2012)

Notable figures

Wales international footballers John and Mel Charles; Ivor and Len Allchurch; Mel Nurse; Jackie Roberts; and Ernie Jones were all born and raised in the area.

Census 2011
In the census of 2011 the situation is as follows:

External links
Friends of the Young Disabled, Cwmbwrla

References

Communities in Swansea
Districts of Swansea